XCES is an XML based standard to encode text corpora, which are used by linguists and natural language researchers. XCES is highly based on the previous EAGLES Corpus Encoding Standard (CES) but uses XML as the markup language. It supports simple corpora as well as annotated corpora, parallel corpora and other.

See also
 Text Encoding Initiative

External links
 
 Corpus Encoding Standard
 EAGLES: (Expert Advisory Group on Language Engineering Standards)

Markup languages